Igreja de São Pedro de Roriz is a church in Roriz, Santo Tirso, Portugal. It is classified as a National Monument.

Churches in Porto District
National monuments in Porto District